The Antique is a 2014 Nigerian drama film directed by Darasen Richards and DJ Tee. It stars Olu Jacobs, Bimbo Akintola, Gabriel Afolayan, Ricardo Agbor, Seun Akindele and Funsho Adeolu.

Plot
The film opens with a scene of a happy and successful community as they share their lot with one another, but there is a sudden turn of event as three strange beings invade the kingdom in search of an antique; which has the power to protect its people and sustain its royalty. The kingdom’s warriors are overpowered and the invaders take away the sacred emblem, thereby bringing a curse on the land.

Decades later, the current Oba’s only son is ill and at the point of death. As revealed by the witch doctor, the sickness is as a result of the missing antique. Therefore, to bring the circles of deaths and famine in the land to end, an innocent girl named Uki (Oge Indiana) is chosen to risk her life by journeying to the land where mortals are forbidden, on a quest to find and return the antique.

Three special warriors, who will stop at nothing until they achieve their purpose, accompany Uki. The journey proves to be a mission almost impossible as they encounter sinister immortal forces, which try to stop them from reaching their goal. The witch doctor with a seductress named Isoken has a hidden agenda as anxiety back in the village unveils series of dynamics in the running of the kingdom. Meanwhile, the return of Uki and the warriors is uncertain.

Cast
Olu Jacobs as Oba Ekpen
Bimbo Akintola as Queen 1
Gabriel Afolayan as Uyi
Ricardo Agbor as Oba Akugba
Seun Akindele as Lead Invader
Funso Adeolu as Enoma
Oge Indiana as Ukinebo
Kiki Omeili as Isoken
Akpororo as Oriri
Omowunmi Dada as Osas
Theresa Edem as Princess
Samuel Ajibola as Prince

References

External links

English-language Nigerian films
2014 drama films
Nigerian drama films
2010s English-language films